Webheath is a district of Redditch, in Worcestershire, England. The district neighbours Batchley, Headless Cross and the village of Callow Hill. It is also near Feckenham and Astwood Bank. Webheath used to be a village but has recently been swallowed up and now comes under the town of Redditch. Residents of Webheath have recently (2012) been alarmed by proposals to build hundreds of extra houses on nearby greenbelt land. The local infrastructure around schools and roads is of great concern. Access to the proposed site is currently very restricted and is only by minor roads. Webheath has one Post Office, 2 pubs, The Rose and Crown and The Foxlydiate Inn which is also a Premier Hotel. There is also a Village Hall and a local grocery store, Biddles.

Schools
Webheath has two first schools, both are located on Downsell Road.
They are:
 Webheath Primary Academy School
 Mount Carmel Catholic First School

Webheath Church of England First School and Our lady of Mount Carmel Catholic First School.

Politics
Webheath comes under the West ward on Redditch Borough Council and it is represented by two councillors - Councillor David Thain from the Green Party, and Councillor Matthew Dormer from the Conservative Party.

Webheath is the final district to the West of the Redditch constituency. The constituency was created in 1997 where Labour's Jacqui Smith was elected until her defeat in 2010. Karen Lumley of the Conservative Party represented Redditch in Westminster until her retirement in 2017, she was succeeded by fellow Conservative Rachel Maclean.

Further Information
Webheath is a semi-rural suburb which lies to the West of Redditch and it is just north of the small rural village of Callow Hill. There are a small selection of amenities, such as pubs The Rose and Crown and The Foxlydiate Arms, as well as a Post Office and the independent grocery Biddles. The local Church of England Church is St Philip's on Church Road which was established by Harriett, 13th Baroness Windsor, although it was not consecrated until after her death, The church was established to serve estate workers from Hewell Grange, and as such is a comparatively modest affair (nave capacity 100) that has only recently listed as a grade II heritage building. The nave has been recently modernised and is warm and comfortable. Building work commenced in 2016 to create space for meetings and storage, and also to provide the much needed toilets. The annual church fete at the beginning of July is a major community event, and Christmas services fill the church to capacity. There is no church history of Webheath; for most of its life it has been dealt with as a daughter church of the much grander St Bartholomew's Tardebigge, although it is now part of the Redditch Holy Trinity team.

References

External links

Webheath First School
Mount Carmel First School
Holy Trinity Redditch

Redditch
Villages in Worcestershire